Florida Russian Lifestyle Magazine is a free online magazine written by Russian speaking people living in the  US state of Florida. The content is in the Russian and English language with original articles, photos and videos of life in Florida from the Russian speakers perspective. The site also features resources to help those relocating to Florida, such as a job search board, Russian business directory and coverage of community events.

History
 Web launch - August 2010
 Apple iPhone Application - September 2010
 Apple iPad Application - January 2012
 HTML5 Compliant Platform launched - January 2014

Awards
Chosen as Official Magazine of Russian-American Community Center of Florida - June 2010

Owners
The magazine is owned and published by Aurous Publishing.

References

External links
 Florida Russian Lifestyle magazine
 Orlando Russian Culture Society
 Russian-American Community Center of Florida

2010 establishments in Florida
Lifestyle magazines published in the United States
Online magazines published in the United States
Free magazines
Local interest magazines published in the United States
Magazines established in 2010
Magazines published in Florida
Russian-language magazines
Russian-language mass media in the United States